The 1998 Canterbury-Bankstown Bulldogs season was the 64th in the club's history. Coached by Steve Folkes and captained by Simon Gillies then Darren Britt, they competed in the 1998 NRL season's, finishing the regular season 9th (out of 20) to make a top-ten play-off grouping before reaching the grand final which they lost to the Brisbane Broncos.

Match results

Grand final

The 1998 NRL grand final was the conclusive and premiership-deciding game of the 1998 NRL season. It was the first grand final of the re-unified National Rugby League and featured minor premiers and the previous year's Super League premiers, the Brisbane Broncos against the Canterbury-Bankstown Bulldogs. It was to be the first grand final under the National Rugby League partnership's administration and the last to be played at the Sydney Football Stadium. It was also the first time these two sides had met in a grand final.

Brisbane scored first but by half time trailed the Canterbury side 10–12. However, the Brisbane club scored 28 unanswered points in the second half, winning 12–38 and equaling the second highest score for a team in grand final history.

See also
 List of Canterbury-Bankstown Bulldogs seasons

References

Canterbury-Bankstown Bulldogs seasons
Canterbury Bulldogs season